Vincent Marie Louis (22 June 1750 – 14 March 1752) was the son of Louis Jean Marie de Bourbon, Duke of Penthièvre and Maria Teresa d’Este. He died before his second birthday.

Life 
Vincent was born on 22 June 1750 in France. He was the fourth child born to Louis Jean Marie de Bourbon, Duke of Penthièvre and Princess Maria Teresa d'Este. His only brother to survive childhood was Louis Alexandre, Prince of Lamballe.

Vincent died at the Palace of Versailles in his mother's suite of rooms. Years after his death, his posthumous sister, Louise Marie Adélaïde de Bourbon, moved his remains to the Royal Chapel of Dreux.

Ancestry

References and notes

1750 births
1752 deaths
Nobility from Paris
Burials at the Chapelle royale de Dreux
House of Bourbon
Counts of Guingamp
Royal reburials
Royalty and nobility who died as children